In category theory, a branch of mathematics, a natural transformation provides a way of transforming one functor into another while respecting the internal structure (i.e., the composition of morphisms) of the categories involved. Hence, a natural transformation can be considered to be a "morphism of functors". Informally, the notion of a natural transformation states that a particular map between functors can be done consistently over an entire category.

Indeed, this intuition can be formalized to define so-called functor categories. Natural transformations are, after categories and functors, one of the most fundamental notions of category theory and consequently appear in the majority of its applications.

Definition
 Components must be such that for every morphism  in  we have:

The last equation can conveniently be expressed by the commutative diagram

Examples

Opposite group

Statements such as
"Every group is naturally isomorphic to its opposite group"
abound in modern mathematics. We will now give the precise meaning of this statement as well as its proof. Consider the category 
 of all groups with group homomorphisms as morphisms. If  is a group, we define 
Forming the opposite group becomes 
Note that 

The content of the above statement is:
"The identity functor  is naturally isomorphic to the opposite functor "
To prove this, we need to provide isomorphisms  for every group , such that the above diagram commutes. 
Set .
The formulas  and 
show that  is a group homomorphism with inverse . To prove the naturality, we start with a group homomorphism 
 and show , i.e. 
This is true since 
 and every group homomorphism has the property .

Abelianization
Given a group , we can define its abelianization  .  Let 
This homomorphism is "natural in 
", i.e., it defines a natural transformation,  which we now check.  Let  be a group.  For any homomorphism , we have that 
Then 
.  This makes  a functor and 

Hurewicz homomorphism 
Functors and natural transformations abound in algebraic topology, with the Hurewicz homomorphisms serving as examples.  For any pointed topological space  and positive integer  there exists a group homomorphism

 

Determinant

to each matrix entry.

 
which is natural in : because the determinant is defined by the same formula for every ring,  holds.

Double dual of a vector space
If  is a field, then for every vector space  over  we have a "natural" injective linear map  from the vector space into its double dual. These maps are "natural" in the following sense: the double dual operation is a functor, and the maps are the components of a natural transformation from the identity functor to the double dual functor.

Finite calculus
For every abelian group , the set  of functions from the integers to the underlying set of  
forms an abelian group  under pointwise addition. (Here  is the standard forgetful functor .) 
Given an  morphism , the map  given by left composing  with the elements of the former is itself a homomorphism of abelian groups; in this way we 
obtain a functor . The finite difference operator  taking each function 

Tensor-hom adjunction

Consider the category  of abelian groups and group homomorphisms. For all abelian groups ,  and  we have a group isomorphism
 .
These isomorphisms are "natural" in the sense that they define a natural transformation between the two involved functors .

This is formally the tensor-hom adjunction, and is an archetypal example of a pair of adjoint functors. Natural transformations arise frequently in conjunction with adjoint functors, and indeed, adjoint functors are defined by a certain natural isomorphism. Additionally, every pair of adjoint functors comes equipped with two natural transformations (generally not isomorphisms) called the unit and counit.

Unnatural isomorphism 

The notion of a natural transformation is categorical, and states (informally) that a particular map between functors can be done consistently over an entire category. Informally, a particular map (esp. an isomorphism) between individual objects (not entire categories) is referred to as a "natural isomorphism", meaning implicitly that it is actually defined on the entire category, and defines a natural transformation of functors; formalizing this intuition was a motivating factor in the development of category theory. Conversely, a particular map between particular objects may be called an unnatural isomorphism (or "this isomorphism is not natural") if the map cannot be extended to a natural transformation on the entire category. Given an object  a functor  (taking for simplicity the first functor to be the identity) and an isomorphism  proof of unnaturality is most easily shown by giving an automorphism  that does not commute with this isomorphism (so ). The maps of the category play a crucial role – any infranatural transform is natural if the only maps are the identity map, for instance.

This is similar (but more categorical) to concepts in group theory or module theory, where a given decomposition of an object into a direct sum is "not natural", or rather "not unique", as automorphisms exist that do not preserve the direct sum decomposition – see  for example.

Example: fundamental group of torus
As an example of the distinction between the functorial statement and individual objects, consider homotopy groups of a product space, specifically the fundamental group of the torus.

The homotopy groups of a product space are naturally the product of the homotopy groups of the components,  with the isomorphism given by projection onto the two factors, fundamentally because maps into a product space are exactly products of maps into the components – this is a functorial statement.

However, if one is given the torus as a product  – equivalently, given a decomposition of the space – then the splitting of the group follows from the general statement earlier. In categorical terms, the relevant category (preserving the structure of a product space) is "maps of product spaces, namely a pair of maps between the respective components".

Naturality is a categorical notion, and requires being very precise about exactly what data is given – the torus as a space that happens to be a product (in the category of spaces and continuous maps) is different from the torus presented as a product (in the category of products of two spaces and continuous maps between the respective components).

Example: dual of a finite-dimensional vector space
Every finite-dimensional vector space is isomorphic to its dual space, but there may be many different isomorphisms between the two spaces. There is in general no natural isomorphism between a finite-dimensional vector space and its dual space. However, related categories (with additional structure and restrictions on the maps) do have a natural isomorphism, as described below.

The dual space of a finite-dimensional vector space is again a finite-dimensional vector space of the same dimension, and these are thus isomorphic, since dimension is the only invariant of finite-dimensional vector spaces over a given field. However, in the absence of additional constraints (such as a requirement that maps preserve the chosen basis), the map from a space to its dual is not unique, and thus such an isomorphism requires a choice, and is "not natural". On the category of finite-dimensional vector spaces and linear maps, one can define an infranatural isomorphism from vector spaces to their dual by choosing an isomorphism for each space (say, by choosing a basis for every vector space and taking the corresponding isomorphism), but this will not define a natural transformation. Intuitively this is because it required a choice, rigorously because any such choice of isomorphisms will not commute with, say, the zero map; see  for detailed discussion.

Starting from finite-dimensional vector spaces (as objects) and the identity and dual functors, one can define a natural isomorphism, but this requires first adding additional structure, then restricting the maps from "all linear maps" to "linear maps that respect this structure". Explicitly, for each vector space, require that it comes with the data of an isomorphism to its dual, . In other words, take as objects vector spaces with a nondegenerate bilinear form . This defines an infranatural isomorphism (isomorphism for each object). One then restricts the maps to only those maps  that commute with the isomorphisms:  or in other words, preserve the bilinear form: . (These maps define the naturalizer of the isomorphisms.) The resulting category, with objects finite-dimensional vector spaces with a nondegenerate bilinear form, and maps linear transforms that respect the bilinear form, by construction has a natural isomorphism from the identity to the dual (each space has an isomorphism to its dual, and the maps in the category are required to commute). Viewed in this light, this construction (add transforms for each object, restrict maps to commute with these) is completely general, and does not depend on any particular properties of vector spaces.

In this category (finite-dimensional vector spaces with a nondegenerate bilinear form, maps linear transforms that respect the bilinear form), the dual of a map between vector spaces can be identified as a transpose. Often for reasons of geometric interest this is specialized to a subcategory, by requiring that the nondegenerate bilinear forms have additional properties, such as being symmetric (orthogonal matrices), symmetric and positive definite (inner product space), symmetric sesquilinear (Hermitian spaces), skew-symmetric and totally isotropic (symplectic vector space), etc. – in all these categories a vector space is naturally identified with its dual, by the nondegenerate bilinear form.

Operations with natural transformations

Vertical composition 

This is done componentwise:
. 

This vertical composition of natural transformations is associative and has an identity, and allows one to consider the collection of all functors  itself as a category (see below under Functor categories).
The identity natural transformation  on functor  has components .
For , .

Horizontal composition 

.
By using whiskering (see below), we can write
,
hence
.

This horizontal composition of natural transformations is also associative with identity.
This identity is the identity natural transformation on the identity functor, i.e., the natural transformation that associate to each object its identity morphism: for object  in category , .

Whiskering 

Whiskering is an external binary operation between a functor and a natural transformation.

.
If on the other hand  is a functor, the natural transformation  is defined by
.

It's also an horizontal composition where one of the natural transformations is the identity natural transformation:

Interchange law 

The two operations are related by an identity which exchanges vertical composition with horizontal composition: if we have four natural transformations  as shown on the image to the right, then the following identity holds:
.
Vertical and horizontal compositions are also linked through identity natural transformations:

.

Functor categories

This forms a category since for any functor  there is an identity natural transformation  (which assigns to every object  the identity morphism on ) and the composition of two natural transformations (the "vertical composition" above) is again a natural transformation.

The functor category  is especially useful if  arises from a directed graph.

More generally, one can build the 2-category  whose
 0-cells (objects) are the small categories,
The horizontal and vertical compositions are the compositions between natural transformations described previously. A functor category  is then simply a hom-category in this category (smallness issues aside).

More examples 
Every limit and colimit provides an example for a simple natural transformation, as a cone amounts to a natural transformation with the diagonal functor as domain.  Indeed, if limits and colimits are defined directly in terms of their universal property, they are universal morphisms in a functor category.

Yoneda lemma

If  is an object of a locally small category , then the assignment  defines a covariant functor . This functor is called representable (more generally, a representable functor is any functor naturally isomorphic to this functor for an appropriate choice of ). The natural transformations from a representable functor to an arbitrary functor  are completely known and easy to describe; this is the content of the Yoneda lemma.

Historical notes 

Saunders Mac Lane, one of the founders of category theory, is said to have remarked, "I didn't invent categories to study functors; I invented them to study natural transformations." Just as the study of groups is not complete without a study of homomorphisms, so the study of categories is not complete without the study of functors. The reason for Mac Lane's comment is that the study of functors is itself not complete without the study of natural transformations.

The context of Mac Lane's remark was the axiomatic theory of homology. Different ways of constructing homology could be shown to coincide: for example in the case of a simplicial complex the groups defined directly would be isomorphic to those of the singular theory.  What cannot easily be expressed without the language of natural transformations is how homology groups are compatible with morphisms between objects, and how two equivalent homology theories not only have the same homology groups, but also the same morphisms between those groups.

See also 

 Extranatural transformation
Universal property
Higher category theory

Notes

References 

 .

External links
 nLab, a wiki project on mathematics, physics and philosophy with emphasis on the n-categorical point of view
 André Joyal, CatLab, a wiki project dedicated to the exposition of categorical mathematics
  formal introduction to category theory.
 J. Adamek, H. Herrlich, G. Strecker, Abstract and Concrete Categories-The Joy of Cats
 Stanford Encyclopedia of Philosophy: "Category Theory"—by Jean-Pierre Marquis. Extensive bibliography.
 List of academic conferences on category theory
 Baez, John, 1996,"The Tale of n-categories." An informal introduction to higher categories.
 WildCats is a category theory package for Mathematica. Manipulation and visualization of objects, morphisms, categories, functors, natural transformations, universal properties.
 The catsters, a YouTube channel about category theory.
 Video archive of recorded talks relevant to categories, logic and the foundations of physics.
Interactive Web page which generates examples of categorical constructions in the category of finite sets.

Functors